Coleman Municipal Airport  is an airport two miles northeast of Coleman, Texas.

History
Opened on 1 October 1941. Began training United States Army Air Corps flying cadets under contract to Coleman Flying School under 304th Flying Training Detachment.  Assigned to United States Army Air Forces Gulf Coast Training Center (later Central Flying Training Command) as a primary (level 1) pilot training airfield. had four local axillary airfields for emergency and overflow landings.  Flying training was performed with Fairchild PT-19s as the primary trainer. Also had several PT-17 Stearmans assigned.

Inactivated on 16 October 1944, with the drawdown of AAFTC's pilot training program. Declared surplus and turned over to the Army Corps of Engineers on 30 September 1945. Eventually discharged to the War Assets Administration (WAA) and became a civil airport.

Airline flights (Trans-Texas DC-3s) ended in 1957.

See also

 Texas World War II Army Airfields
 31st Flying Training Wing (World War II)

References

 Manning, Thomas A. (2005), History of Air Education and Training Command, 1942–2002.  Office of History and Research, Headquarters, AETC, Randolph AFB, Texas 
 Shaw, Frederick J. (2004), Locating Air Force Base Sites, History’s Legacy, Air Force History and Museums Program, United States Air Force, Washington DC.

External links
 
 

1941 establishments in Texas
USAAF Contract Flying School Airfields
Airfields of the United States Army Air Forces in Texas
Buildings and structures in Coleman County, Texas
Transportation in Coleman County, Texas
Airports established in 1941
USAAF Central Flying Training Command
American Theater of World War II